The Famous Paparazzo is a 1999 Romanian drama film directed by Nicolae Mărgineanu. It was Romania's official Best Foreign Language Film submission at the 72nd Academy Awards, but did not manage to receive a nomination. It was also entered into the 22nd Moscow International Film Festival.

Cast 
 Marcel Iureș as Gari
 Maria Ploae as Miss
 Gheorghe Dinică as Procurorul
 Valeriu Popescu as Politicianul
 Draga Olteanu-Matei as Vecina de mansardă
 Alexandru Repan as ''Director de ziar
 Victoria Cociaș
 Gheorghe Visu	
 Mădălina Constantin
 Vlad Ivanov	
 George Alexandru
 Adriana Trandafir
 Valentin Teodosiu
 Adriana Șchiopu
 Monica Ghiuță
 Tudor Manole
 Armand Calotă	
 Ion Pavlescu
 Miruna Birău
 Vlad Ivanov
 George Ivașcu
 Dan Chișu
 Cerasela Iosifescu
 Șerban Pavlu
 Viorel Păunescu
 Adrian Dumitru
 Radu Stoenescu
 Constantin Bărbulescu
 Dragoș Pârvulescu
 Liviu Timuș
 Florin Anton

References

External links

1999 films
1999 drama films
1990s Romanian-language films
Romanian drama films